Oguzname is the name of several historical books about the legends of the Turkic peoples. It is a composite word where Oğuz refers to Oghuz Khagan, the legendary king of the Turkic peoples and name means the story. According to the Islam encyclopaedia the number of Oğuznames may be as high as 30. Book of Dede Korkut and Selçukname are among these.

Jāmiʿ al-Tawārīkh
One of the most important Oğuznames is  Jāmiʿ al-Tawārīkh by Rashid-al-Din Hamadani: According to Ümit Hassan the legends can be classified under five sections;  
Oghuz Khagan  
Yabghus of Oghuz people  
Kara Khagan and Bugra Khagan
Shah Malik and Seljuks
Some Turkic families

References

Turkish legends
Ethnic Turkmen culture